John Murdoch Beattie (28 May 1912 – 15 January 1992), generally known as Jack Beattie, was a Scottish professional association footballer who played as an inside forward. He played in the Scottish League for Aberdeen, and made more than 200 appearances in the English Football League representing Wolverhampton Wanderers, Blackburn Rovers, Birmingham, Huddersfield Town and Grimsby Town before his career was brought to an end by the Second World War. He was born in Newhills, Aberdeen, Scotland, and died in Wolverhampton, Staffordshire, England at the age of 79.

References

1912 births
1992 deaths
Footballers from Aberdeen
Scottish footballers
Association football forwards
Aberdeen F.C. players
Wolverhampton Wanderers F.C. players
Blackburn Rovers F.C. players
Birmingham City F.C. players
Huddersfield Town A.F.C. players
Grimsby Town F.C. players
English Football League players
Scottish Football League players